Hong Kong competed at the 2022 World Games held in Birmingham, United States from 7 to 17 July 2022. Athletes representing Hong Kong won one gold medal and four bronze medals. The country finished in 43rd place in the medal table.

Medalists

Invitational sports

Competitors
The following list specifies the number of competitors for Hong Kong in each sport.

Air sports

Hong Kong competed in drone racing.

Drone racing

Cue sports

Hong Kong won one gold medal in cue sports.

Karate

Hong Kong won one bronze medal in karate.

Muaythai

Hong Kong competed in muaythai.

Orienteering

Hong Kong competed in orienteering.

Men

Women

Mixed

Roller skating

Road

Hong Kong competed in road speed skating.

Track

Hong Kong competed in track speed skating.

Squash

Hong Kong competed in squash.

Wushu

Hong Kong won three medals in wushu.

References

Nations at the 2022 World Games
2022
World Games